Masséré is a town in the Kindi Department of Boulkiemdé Province in central western Burkina Faso. It has a population of 1,334.

References

Populated places in Boulkiemdé Province